Robert Harling may refer to:
Robert Harling (knight) (died 1435), English soldier
Robert Harling (typographer) (1910-2008), British typographer  
Robert Harling (writer) (born 1951), American writer